Avner Strauss (born 1954 in Jerusalem, Israel) is an Israeli music producer, musician, guitarist singer/songwriter and poet. He has also written books and music for children.

Biography 
Strauss picked up the electric guitar at age 14, and began playing in rock bands in the late 1960s. In 1971 he formed the first Israeli Blues band, and wrote one of the first Israeli Twelve-bar blues;  " I got a Telephone, Ain't got no one to call ".
Drawn to jazz guitar, Avner went to Boston in 1975 to study at the Berklee College of Music (Composition, graduated in 1978).

Upon returning to Israel in 1978, he began recording and teaching music, and received an appointment as a guitar professor at the Jerusalem Academy of Music and Dance.
For few years after he was the advisor of the Israeli guitar company "Yuval" and endorsed their guitars giving concerts (1980–1984) in the frankfurt trade fair "Musikmesse".

Avner Strauss' musical instrument store in Jerusalem ("Effect") in the 1980s was the first Israeli store dedicated solely to guitars.

Although he started out as an Avant Garde guitarist in Jerusalem in the late 1960s, today Strauss plays jazz, flamenco, classical, folk, bluegrass and blues guitar.

Avner has published two illustrated story books for young children ("The Porcupine", "Mr. Frog") and one book of poetry for adults ("Distance and Other Measures").

He has produced three audio CDs of original Hebrew songs, including a live CD of Blues in Hebrew, and a CD and animated DVD of his original children's songs.

Avner also produced an instrumental guitar album ("Courtyard", MCI records 1990) that highlights his many different musical facets and playing styles.

During the years Strauss devoted many years to the research of catalogs and collecting whistles, he published hundreds of articles about the subject and about the History of whistle manufacturers in the 19th century and is considered one of the world's foremost authorities on the subject of collecting whistles, some of his articles and samples of his collection which might be the largest known, can be found on the Whistle Museum.

Avner Strauss is the founder of "Strauss Mifaaley Tarbut" and Sal Tarbut Strauss (Hebrew:"סל תרבות שטראוס") that were involved with education for the arts in the educational system in Israel since 1986, producing music, dance, theatre, cinema, literature and plastic arts shows and activities for schools.

Discography 

 On A Slow Flame 1987 vinyl album, 11 tracks (Eastronics)
 On A Slow Flame 2nd edition 1995 CD, with 5 Bonus tracks (Hed Artzi)
 Courtyard (Instrumental guitar) 1990 (M.C.I Records)
 In Jerusalem, the Heavens Are Nearer 1990 (Phonokol)
 1/2% Blues 1995 (Hed Artzi)
 Friends of The Rhino 2004 (CD and DVD) (Strauss Ltd.)
 Equator 2013 (double CD, Fingerstyle guitar-Eastern and Western Hemispheres)
 Blues Haor Haganuz 13 June 2014, Buber's death year date (double CD 23 songs 6 English titles)
 Tel Aviv's Blues 1 December 2016,
 Tesha 9 June 2018

Poetry

Avner Strauss poems have been published in various magazines among these are; Mantis 1976, April 2010, February 2011 issues of Moznaim and in the Jewish poetry anthology "Voices Within the Ark" along with poems by his grandfather :de:Ludwig Strauss and great grandfather Martin Buber.

 Birds of the Mind
 Chameleons of the Heart.
 Distance and Other Measures. Poems 1976-1992, Hebrew, (Yaron Golan publications).

Children

 The Hedgehog Who Fell in Love with a Hairbrush 2005
 Mr. Frog  2005 (Strauss Books).

See also
 Sal Tarbut Strauss
 Ludwig Strauss (DE Wikipedia)
 "Touched By the Blues" Stories of the Unsung Heroes of the Blues
 Avner Strauss Biography and Discography In the Mooma Encyclopedya
 The Nation 1989 With Paul Stookey Concert Review 1989

Notes

External links

 Avner Strauss home website.
 Avner Strauss on Bandcamp.
 Sal Tarbut Strauss's founded Israeli cultural venue.
 
 Avner Strauss Fingersyle Guitar Instrumentals
 Avner Strauss - from WN Network. WorldNews
 Scans from newspapers and magazines
 Notes and samples of the 31 pieces on the "Equator" album 
 Blues Haor Haganuz
 Courtyard album on amg website
 Avner Strauss guitar instrumentals samples.

Israeli guitarists
Jewish Israeli musicians
Musicians from Jerusalem
1954 births
Living people
Israeli male poets